The John Paul II Jasne Błonia Square, commonly known as Jasne Błonia, and until 1945 known as Quistorp-Aue, is an urban green space in the city of Szczecin, Poland. It is located in the district of Śródmieście, in the Śródmieście-Północ municipal neighbourhood. The park borders Szczecin City Hall to the south, and Jan Kasprowicz Park to the north.

Characteristics 

The park consists of a long rectangle-shaped lawn surrounded by alleys on its sides, with rows of flowers and London plane trees.

It is located in the district of Śródmieście, in the Śródmieście-Północ municipal neighbourhood. The park borders Szczecin City Hall to the south, and Jan Kasprowicz Park to the north, with the Monument to Polish Endeavor at its entrance. The Monument of John Paul II, located within the park, was designed by Czesław Dźwigaj and Stanisław Latour and constructed in 1987.

History 
The park was built in years 1925–1927, on the lands that were donated in 1925 to the city by Martin Quistorp. Square was named after him, Quistorp-Aue. Following World War II, when the city of Stettin (now Szczecin), Poland was transferred from the occupied Germany to Poland, the park was renamed to Jasne Błonia.

Throughout its history, various massive events and festivals were hosted in the park, including the Trzymamy Straż Nad Odrą in 1946, and the meeting with Nikita Khrushchev, leader of the Soviet Union, in 1959.

In 1979, at the entrance to the Jan Kasprowicz Park from the Jasne Błonia square, was built the Monument to Polish Endeavor by artist Kazimierz Gustaw Zemła.

On 11 June 1987, Pope John Paul II had performed a mass on the Jasne Błonia square, during his visit to Poland. The altar had been placed in front of the Monument to Polish Endeavor. In 1987, in the park was placed the Monument of John Paul II, to commemorate this event. It was designed by Czesław Dźwigaj and Stanisław Latour. In 1995, the square had been given full official name, that is the John Paul II Jasne Błonia Square. It continues to be commonly referred to simply as Jasne Błonia.

In 2004, the square was included on the voivodeship heriatage register.

Notes

References 

Parks in Szczecin
Buildings and structures in Szczecin
1927 establishments in Germany